Covered in the Flood is a full-length studio album of cover songs by American musician Chris Carrabba, released on November 17, 2011. It was available exclusively during his solo US tour in 2011.

Best known as the singer-songwriter for emo band Dashboard Confessional, it is the first official release for Carrabba as a solo artist.

Background and recording
In an interview with PropertyOfZack at SXSW in 2013, Carrabba described the artists on the LP as "my influences and I don’t think there’s anything wrong with embracing them." He stated that he didn't want the album "to be pure imitation."

Track listing

References

External links 
 

2011 albums
Covers albums